is a 1958 Japanese film directed by Yoshiki Onoda and starring Yōko Mihara.  The film marked Mihara's debut as the star of Shintoho's series of ama films, a role she took over from Michiko Maeda. The film has never been released on home video, but is not lost as some sources claim.

Cast
 Yōko Mihara: Sada
 Ken Utsui: Gorō Negishi
 Kyōko Yashiro: Izumi
 Tetsurō Tamba: Miyata
 Utako Mitsuya: Kazue
 Masayo Banri: Tomi
 Keiko Minakami: Aki
 Akihiko Hirata: Makino

References

External links
 
 
 

1958 films
Japanese black-and-white films
1950s Japanese-language films
Films directed by Yoshiki Onoda
1950s Japanese films